Scandal is a 1917 American black and white silent comedy drama film directed by Charles Giblyn and based on a novel by Cosmo Hamilton. The film scenario is written by Bess Meredyth. It is one of the first films to star Constance Talmadge.

Plot
As described in a film magazine review, Beatrice Vanderdyke, a young society woman, in order to defend her reputation, claims to be secretly married to a young man of the same station who is away on a honeymoon cruise. The parents are delighted and later send the two on a boat trip. He falls in love with her, but she does not feel the same way, so he decides to keep her on a desert island until she changes her mind. At this point they are called back home to prove their marriage, and the approaching social catastrophe makes her realize that she loves the man. They marry and set out on a real honeymoon trip.

Cast

See also
Another Scandal (1924)

References

External links

American comedy-drama films
1917 comedy-drama films
1910s English-language films
American black-and-white films
Films directed by Charles Giblyn
Films based on British novels
Selznick Pictures films
1917 films
1910s American films
Silent American comedy-drama films